The 1958 San Diego State Aztecs football team represented San Diego State College during the 1958 NCAA College Division football season.

San Diego State competed in the California Collegiate Athletic Association (CCAA). The team was led by head coach Paul Governali, in his third year, and played home games at Aztec Bowl. They finished the season with three wins and five losses (3–5, 2–3 CCAA). The Aztecs scored only 84 points in their eight games while giving up 200.

Schedule

Team players in the NFL
No San Diego State players were selected in the 1959 NFL Draft.

Notes

References

San Diego State
San Diego State Aztecs football seasons
San Diego State Aztecs football